Alison O'Donnell may refer to:

Alison O'Donnell (actor), Scottish actor
Alison O'Donnell (musician), Irish musician and singer